Polititapes aureus is a species of bivalve belonging to the family Veneridae.

The species is found in Western Europe and Mediterranean.

Synonyms
 
 Paphia aurea (Gmelin, 1791)
 Paphia lucens (Locard, 1886)
 Pullastra intuspunctata Anton, 1838
 Tapes (Tapes) aureus (Gmelin, 1791)
 Tapes acuminata G. B. Sowerby II, 1852
 Tapes amygdala Meuschen Römer, 1864
 Tapes anatina G. B. Sowerby II, 1854
 Tapes anthemodus Locard, 1886 
 Tapes aureus (Gmelin, 1791)
 Tapes aureus var. elongata  Dautzenberg, 1883
 Tapes aureus var. ovata  Jeffreys, 1864
 Tapes aureus var. partita Bucquoy, Dautzenberg & Dollfus, 1893 
 Tapes aureus var. quadrata Jeffreys, 1864 
 Tapes aureus var. radiata Bucquoy, Dautzenberg & Dollfus, 1893
 Tapes aureus var. rugata Bucquoy, Dautzenberg & Dollfus, 1893 
 Tapes bourguignati Locard, 1886
 Tapes castrensis Deshayes, 1848 (dubious synonym)
 Tapes castrensis var. texturoides Pallary, 1912 
 Tapes grangeri Locard, 1886 
 Tapes hoeberti Brusina, 1865
 Tapes lacunaris Coen, 1914 
 Tapes mabillei Locard, 1886 
 Tapes nasuta Coen, 1914 
 Tapes nitidosus Locard, 1886 
 Tapes nuculoides Coen, 1914
 Tapes pulchellus (Lamarck, 1818)
 Tapes pulchellus var. bicolor Pallary, 1900
 Tapes retortus Locard, 1886 
 Tapes rochebrunei Locard, 1886 
 Tapes rostratus Locard, 1886
 Tapes servaini Locard, 1886
 Venerupis aurea (Gmelin, 1791)
 Venerupis lucens (Locard, 1886)
 Venus aenea W. Turton, 1819
 Venus araneosa Philippi, 1847
 Venus aurea Gmelin, 1791 (original combination)
 Venus beudantii Payraudeau, 1826
 Venus bicolor Lamarck, 1818
 Venus catenifera Lamarck, 1818
 Venus florida Lamarck, 1818 
 Venus floridella Lamarck, 1818
 Venus intuspunctata Anton, 1838 (junior synonym)
 Venus nitens W. Turton, 1819
 Venus nitens Scacchi & Philippi in Philippi, 1844
 Venus pallei Requien, 1848
 Venus petalina Lamarck, 1818
 Venus phaseolina Lamarck, 1818
 Venus picturata Requien, 1848 (synonym)
 Venus pulchella Lamarck, 1818
 Venus texturata Lamarck, 1818

Right and left valve of the same specimens:

Description
These are moderately convex valves with colore pale yellow, white or chestnut with broken zigzag lines, or dark-chestnut patches. On the other hand the valves consistently golden yellow, hence its specific name. The sculpture is confined to moderately impressed concentric growth lines.

References

 Coen, G. (1914). Contributo allo studio della fauna malacologica adriatica. Memorie del Regio Comitato Talassografico Italiano. 46: 3-34, pl. 1-7
 Huber, M. (2010). Compendium of bivalves. A full-color guide to 3,300 of the world's marine bivalves. A status on Bivalvia after 250 years of research. Hackenheim: ConchBooks. 901 pp., 1 CD-ROM.

External links
 Gmelin J.F. (1791). Vermes. In: Gmelin J.F. (Ed.) Caroli a Linnaei Systema Naturae per Regna Tria Naturae, Ed. 13. Tome 1(6). G.E. Beer, Lipsiae
 urton, W. (1819) A Conchological Dictionary of the British Islands. J. Booth, London, xxvii + 272 pp., 28 pls.
 Payraudeau, B. C. (1826). Catalogue descriptif et méthodique des annelides et des mollusques de l'Ile de Corse; avec huit planches représentant quatre-vingt-huit espèces, dont soixante-huit nouvelles. 218 pp. Paris
 Lamarck (J.-B. M.) de. (1818). Histoire naturelle des animaux sans vertèbres. Tome 5. Paris: Deterville/Verdière, 612 pp.
 Anton, H. E. (1838). Verzeichniss der Conchylien welche sich in der Sammlung von Herrmann Eduard Anton befinden. Herausgegeben von dem Besitzer. Halle: Anton. xvi + 110 pp.
 Philippi, R. A. (1844). Enumeratio molluscorum Siciliae cum viventium tum in tellure tertiaria fossilium, quae in itinere suo observavit. Vol. 2.. Halle
 Deshayes, G. P. (1845-1848). Exploration scientifique de l'Algérie. Histoire naturelle des Mollusques. Tome premier. Mollusques Acéphalés. Paris, Imprimerie Royale xx + 609 pp
 Brusina S. (1865). Conchiglie dalmate inedite. Verhandlungen der Kaiserlich-königlichen Zoologisch-botanisch Gesellschaft in Wien. 15: 3-42
 Requien, E. (1848). Catalogue des coquilles de l'Île de Corse. Avignon: Seguin. v-xii, 13-109 pp.
 Jeffreys J.G. (1862-1869). British conchology. Vol. 1: pp. cxiv + 341 London, van Voorst
 Pallary, P. (1900). Coquilles marines du littoral du département d'Oran. Journal de Conchyliologie. 48(3): 211-422
 Pallary, P. (1912). Catalogue des mollusques du littoral méditerranéen de l'Egypte. Mémoires de l'Institut d'Egypte. 7(3): 69-207
 Bucquoy E., Dautzenberg P. & Dollfus G. (1887-1898). Les mollusques marins du Roussillon. Tome II. Pélécypodes. Paris, J.B. Baillière & fils 884 p., 99 pl
 Dautzenberg, Ph. (1883). Liste de coquilles du Golfe de Gabès. J. conchyliol. 31: 289-330

Veneridae